The 2017 Men's Summer Universiade Volleyball Tournament was the 29th edition of the event, organized by the Summer Universiade. It was held in Taipei, Taiwan from 20 to 29 August 2017.

Pool standing procedure
 Match points
 Number of matches won
 Sets ratio
 Points ratio
 Result of the last match between the tied teams

Match won 3–0 or 3–1: 3 match points for the winner, 0 match points for the loser
Match won 3–2: 2 match points for the winner, 1 match point for the loser

Preliminary round
All times are Taiwan Standard Time (UTC+08:00)

Pool A

|}

|}

Pool B

|}

|}

Pool C

|}

|}

Pool D

|}

|}

Final round

17th–22nd places

17th–22nd place quarterfinals 

|}

17th–20th place semifinals 

|}

21st place match 

|}

19th place match 

|}

17th place match 

|}

9th–16th places

9th–16th place quarterfinals 

|}

13th–16th place semifinals 

|}

9th–12th place semifinals 

|}

15th place match 

|}

13th place match 

|}

11th place match 

|}

9th place match 

|}

1st–8th places

Quarterfinals 

|}

5th–8th place semifinals 

|}

Semifinals 

|}

7th place match 

|}

5th place match 

|}

Third place match 

|}

Final 

|}

Final standing

Medalists

References

External links
2017 Summer Universiade – Volleyball – Men's tournament

Men
Universiade